Stephen "Steve" Wray (20 May 1962 - 22 December 2009) was a Bahamian former athlete who competed mostly as a high jumper.

Biography
Wray is best known for winning a silver medal in the high jump at the 1982 Commonwealth Games in Brisbane, in which he set a personal best and equalled the Commonwealth record, 2.31 metres. Over the course of the event he bettered his previous career best jump (2.23m) three times, clearing 2.25m and then 2.28m, before drawing level with Canada's Milton Ottey on 2.31m. He only lost out on the gold medal to Ottey on count-back, as the Canadian had made the clearance in his first attempt.

At the 1983 World Championships in Athletics, Wray competed in the high jump competition, but couldn't force his way into the final.

He also competed at the 1984 Summer Olympics, where he was unable to register a successful jump.

On 22 December 2009, both Wray and another fisherman were on a boat which overturned off the coast of Nassau. His body was never recovered.

References

External links
Steve Wray at Sports Reference

1962 births
2009 deaths
Bahamian male athletes
Olympic athletes of the Bahamas
Athletes (track and field) at the 1984 Summer Olympics
Athletes (track and field) at the 1982 Commonwealth Games
Commonwealth Games silver medallists for the Bahamas
Commonwealth Games medallists in athletics
Sportspeople from Nassau, Bahamas
Accidental deaths in the Bahamas
Boating accident deaths
People lost at sea
Central American and Caribbean Games medalists in athletics
Medallists at the 1982 Commonwealth Games